Johann Melchior Roos (December 27, 1663, Heidelberg – 1731, Braunschweig), was a German Baroque painter.

Biography
According to the RKD He was born in Heidelberg and learned to paint from his father, the landscape painter Johann Heinrich Roos. In 1682-1685 he studied at the drawing academy of the Confrerie Pictura in the Hague, and in 1686 he travelled to Rome where he worked with his brother Philipp Peter Roos (Rosa di Tivoli) in Italy. He is known for Italianate landscapes with animals and portraits.

References

Johann Melchior Roos on Artnet

1663 births
1731 deaths
German Baroque painters
Artists from Heidelberg